Kim Young-jae or Kim Yeong-jae is a Korean name and may refer to:
Kim Yong-jae (born 1952), North Korean politician
Kim Young-jae (actor, born 1975), South Korean actor
Kim Young-jae (actor, born 1995), South Korean actor